Riina may refer to:

Salvatore Riina
Charlie Riina

Riina (given name)